WSPJ-LP is an FCC licensed community non-commercial educational LPFM radio station in Syracuse, New York, owned by local non-profit group Syracuse Community Radio, Inc. and branded as "Spark!". They also operate translator W229CU on 93.7 FM to gain additional coverage. SCR reports that "103.3 FM started signal testing on Sunday, October 1, 2017 and 93.7 FM started signal testing later in the same week". Both were licensed by the FCC on October 18, 2017.

Translator
In addition to the main station, WSPJ-LP is relayed by an additional translator to widen its broadcast area.

See also
List of community radio stations in the United States

References

External links
 

SPJ-LP
Community radio stations in the United States
SPJ-LP
Radio stations established in 2017
2017 establishments in New York (state)